The Pura Cup 2006–07 season was the 105th season of the Australian domestic First-class cricket competition played in Australia, known as the Pura Cup.  The Tasmanian Tigers defeated the New South Wales Blues in the final at Bellerive Oval, winning the trophy for the first time.

Fixture
Game 1 – Qld v Tas (GABBA), Oct 13–16
Game 2 – WA v Vic (WACA), Oct 15–18
Game 3 – NSW v SA (SCG), Oct 17–20
Game 4 – WA v Tas (WACA), Oct 22–25
Game 5 – Qld v NSW (GABBA), Oct 27–30
Game 6 – SA v Vic (Adelaide Oval), Oct 27–30
Game 7 – SA v NSW (Adelaide Oval), Nov 3–6
Game 8 – WA v Qld (WACA), Nov 12–15
Game 9 – Vic v Tas (MCG), Nov 14–17
Game 10 – NSW v WA (SCG), Nov 24–27
Game 11 – Vic v Qld (MCG), Nov 24–27
Game 12 – Tas v SA (Bellerive), Dec 6–9
Game 13 – Vic v NSW (MCG), Dec 15–18
Game 14 – SA v Qld (Adelaide Oval), Dec 15–18
Game 15 – Tas v WA (Bellerive), Dec 19–22
Game 16 – NSW v Vic (SCG), Jan 16–19
Game 17 – Tas v Qld (Bellerive), Jan 19–22
Game 18 – WA v SA (WACA), Jan 19–22
Game 19 – Vic v SA (MCG), Jan 26–29
Game 20 – NSW v Tas (SCG), Jan 27–30
Game 21 – Qld v WA (GABBA), Jan 28–31
Game 22 – Qld v SA (GABBA), Feb 9–12
Game 23 – WA v NSW (WACA), Feb 9–12
Game 24 – Tas v Vic (Bellerive), Feb 12–15
Game 25 – NSW v Qld (SCG), Mar 1–4
Game 26 – Vic v WA (MCG), Mar 1–4
Game 27 – SA v Tas (Adelaide Oval), Mar 1–4
Game 28 – Tas v NSW (Bellerive), Mar 8–11
Game 29 – SA v WA (Adelaide Oval), Mar 8–11
Game 30 – Qld v Vic (GABBA), Mar 8–11

Squads
VICTORIA
Cricket Australia Contract: Brad Hodge, Shane Warne
State Contract: Jason Arnberger, Rob Cassell, Adam Crosthwaite, Gerard Denton, Shane Harwood, David Hussey, Nick Jewell, Michael Klinger, Brad Knowles, Michael Lewis, Lloyd Mash, Andrew McDonald, Jon Moss, Dirk Nannes, Peter Siddle, Cameron White, Allan Wise
Rookie Contract: Grant Baldwin, Aiden Blizzard, Aaron Finch, Matthew Gale, Jon Holland, Peter Nevill

NEW SOUTH WALES
Cricket Australia Contract: Nathan Bracken, Stuart Clark, Michael Clarke, Brad Haddin, Phil Jaques, Simon Katich, Brett Lee, Glenn McGrath, Stuart MacGill
State Contract: Aaron Bird, Doug Bollinger, Mark Cameron, Beau Casson, Ed Cowan, Scott Coyte, Murray Creed, Nathan Hauritz, Moises Henriques, Jason Krejza, Grant Lambert, Tim Lang, Greg Mail, Matthew Nicholson, Aaron O’Brien, James Packman, Grant Roden, Craig Simmons, Daniel Smith, Dominic Thornely
Rookie Contract: Tom Cooper, Peter Forrest, John Hastings, Usman Khawaja, Stephen O'Keefe, Martin Paskal, David Warner

QUEENSLAND
Cricket Australia Contract: Matthew Hayden, Mitchell Johnson, Michael Kasprowicz, Andrew Symonds, Shane Watson
State Contract: Andy Bichel, Ryan Broad, Daniel Doran, Chris Hartley, James Hopes, Shane Jurgensen, Nick Kruger, Martin Love, Jimmy Maher, Brendan Nash, Ashley Noffke, Clinton Perren, Craig Philipson, Nathan Rimmington, Chris Simpson, Lachlan Stevens, Grant Sullivan
Rookie Contracts: Murray Bragg, Ben Cutting, Ryan LeLoux, Nathan Reardon

SOUTH AUSTRALIA
Cricket Australia Contract: Daniel Cullen, Jason Gillespie, Shaun Tait
State Contract: Nathan Adcock, Cullen Bailey, Greg Blewett, Cameron Borgas, Ben Cameron, Mark Cleary, Mark Cosgrove, Shane Deitz, Matthew Elliott, Callum Ferguson, Daniel Harris, Ryan Harris, Trent Kelly, Darren Lehmann, Graham Manou, Gary Putland, Paul Rofe
Rookie Contract: Lachlan Oswald-Jacobs, Tom Plant, Simon Roberts, Chadd Sayers, Ken Skewes

WESTERN AUSTRALIA
Cricket Australia Contract: Adam Gilchrist, Brad Hogg, Mike Hussey, Justin Langer, Damien Martyn
State Contract: David Bandy, Brett Dorey, Ben Edmondson, Sean Ervine, Shawn Gillies, Aaron Heal, Clint Heron, Mathew Inness, Andrew James, Tim MacDonald, Steve Magoffin, Shaun Marsh, Scott Meuleman, Marcus North, Chris Rogers, Luke Ronchi, Adam Voges, Darren Wates, Peter Worthington
Rookie Contract: Arron Crawford, Nathan Coulter-Nile, Liam Davis, Theo Doropoulos, Craig King, Josh Mangan, Luke Pomersbach

TASMANIA
Cricket Australia Contract: Ricky Ponting
State Contract: George Bailey, Michael Bevan, Travis Birt, Luke Butterworth, Sean Clingeleffer, David Dawson, Michael Dighton, Michael Di Venuto, Xavier Doherty, Andrew Downton, Brendan Drew, Brett Geeves, Adam Griffith, Ben Hilfenhaus, Dan Marsh, Tim Paine, Damien Wright
Rookie Contract: Dane Anderson, Alex Doolan, Chris Duval, Jason Shelton, Matthew Wade, Jonathon Wells 
Squad Members: Nick Grainer, Scott Kremerskothen, Rhett Lockyear, Darren McNees, Adam Polkinghorne, Jade Selby, Luke Swards, Nathan Wegman

Points table

Final
The Final was played between Tasmania and New South Wales from March 19 to 23, 2007. By virtue of finishing on top of the table at the end of the season, Tasmania won the right to host the final at Bellerive Oval. Highlighted by individual efforts from Ben Hilfenhaus, Damien Wright and man-of-the-match Luke Butterworth, Tasmania won convincingly by 421 runs to claim their maiden first-class championship, after finishing runner-up three times. They had only been competing full-time since the 1982/83 season; before that, when they joined the competition, they only played one game against every state.

Statistics

Most runs

Most wickets

References

External links
cricket.com.au cricket Australia official site
Competition Results & Statistics

Sheffield Shield
Sheffield Shield
Sheffield Shield seasons